Martinez is an unincorporated community in eastern Bexar County, Texas, United States. In 1990, its population was reported to be 75 residents. It is located within the Greater San Antonio metropolitan area.

History
Martinez was a station on the Galveston, Harrisburg and San Antonio Railway in 1877. Its population was 50 in 1910, with a store owned and operated by W.C. Schlather. It remained the same in 1940, with the opening of three more businesses. It continued to grow slowly, with the population reaching 75 in 1990. It was listed on county maps in 2000, but with no further population records.

Geography
Martinez lies near Converse at the intersection of Farm to Market Roads 1346 and 1516, ten miles east of Downtown San Antonio.

Two rivers that flow through the community are Martinez Creek and Calaveras Creek.

Education
Martinez is served by the East Central Independent School District. Children in the community attend Sinclair Elementary School in San Antonio.

References

Cities in Texas
Cities in Bexar County, Texas